The Norton Couloir or Great Couloir is a steep, gully high on the north face of Mount Everest in Tibet which lies east of the pyramidal peak and extends to within 150 m below the summit.

Its companion to the west of the summit is the Hornbein Couloir.

Origin of the name 
He avoided the dangerous windswept ridge and, by traversing the north face, ascended into the couloir, which has since borne his name.

Everest solo, Reinhold Messner 
The Norton Couloir was the scene of one of the greatest mountaineering achievements when, in 1980, Reinhold Messner entered this gully to avoid what, for a solo climber, was a dangerous ridge - especially its crux, the "Second Step" - and ascended to the summit, alone and without using supplemental oxygen. The most successful climb to that point by F. Edward Norton in 1924, was Messner's inspiration for this attempt: Norton had also used no oxygen.

Other climbs through the couloir 
In 1984 an Australian expedition succeeded in climbing a new route. From the main branch of the Rongbuk Glacier they went directly onto the north face and established their third high-altitude camp at the entrance of the couloir at 7,500 metres. From another camp at 8,150 m Tim Macartney-Snape and Greg Mortimer reached the summit on 2 October without bottled oxygen, the first Australians to reach the top of Everest.

In 2001, French snowboarder Marco Siffredi succeeded in the first snowboard descent of Everest by using the Norton Couloir. He died the following year, attempting a new descent via the Hornbein Couloir.

References

Further reading 

Mount Everest
Landforms of Tibet
Canyons and gorges of China